Tire meatballs, which are peculiar to the Tire district of İzmir, Turkey, are grilled with a thickness of a pen on thin skewers. No spices other than salt are used in its minced meat; and the meatballs are served with a buttery tomato sauce. The essential taste of Tire meatballs is revealed by the village butter used in its sauce. These meatballs, also known as Delikli (drilled) meatballs and Tire Kebab in the public are served by putting fresh parsley on them. Optionally, Tire meatballs may also be served with yoghurt.

See also

Kabab koobideh, Iranian minced meat
Adana kebabı, Turkish minced meat
Kebapche, Bulgarian minced meat
Mititei, Romanian minced meat
Ćevapi, Balkan minced meat
İnegöl meatballs, Turkish minced meat
Akçaabat meatballs, Turkish minced meat
 List of meatball dishes

References

Kofta
Barbecue
Turkish cuisine